Ralph B. Hodges (also known as R. B. Hodges) was born and raised in Anadarko, Oklahoma. He earned his J. D. degree from the University of Oklahoma. After serving as Bryan County Attorney and as District Judge, Hodges was appointed to the Oklahoma Supreme Court by Governor Henry Bellmon on April 19, 1965, as Associate Justice, where he would serve until his retirement from the Court in 2004. During that time he also served as Chief Justice of the Oklahoma Supreme Court from 1977–1978 and 1993–1994.

Early life and education
Born in Anadarko, Oklahoma, to Dewey and Pearl Hodges on August 4, 1930, Hodges graduated from Anadarko High School in 1948, where he lettered in football and baseball. Hodges received his Bachelor of Arts from Oklahoma Baptist University in 1952 and his Juris Doctor from the University of Oklahoma in 1954.

Career in law
After graduating from law school Hodges was in private practice in Durant, Oklahoma, from April 1954 until January 1957. From 1957 to 1959 Hodges served as the Bryan County Attorney before he was elected District Judge in 1958 and re-elected in 1962. 

On April 19, 1965, Oklahoma Governor Henry Bellmon appointed Hodges as a justice of the Oklahoma Supreme Court. At the time of his appointment to the Court, Hodges was 34 years old, becoming the youngest Justice to serve on the Oklahoma Supreme Court since statehood. Hodges was retained (re-elected) to the Court in 1966, 1968, 1974, 1980, 1986, and 1992; serving two terms as chief justice from 1977–1978 and 1993–1994.

"English-only petition"
In 2002, Justice Hodges wrote the majority opinion for Initiative Petition No. 366, which would have required that all official state business be conducted only in English. If passed at a general election, it would have banned using "...state money from being spent on translations for public documents or providing services in a different language." The majority opinion rejected the petition as an unconstitutional limitation on freedom of speech as well as infringing the rights of non English speaking
citizens to interact with their government. As stated in Hodges' written opinion, "Restricting all governmental communications to English prevents citizens who are of limited English proficiency from effectively communicating with their government."

The proposed initiative could not be put on the general election ballot.

Awards and honors
 In 1977, Justice Hodges was named Outstanding State Appellate Jurist by The Association of Trial Lawyers of America; 
 Hodges served on the Board of Trustees for Oklahoma Baptist University from 1968 until 1971;
 In 1982, he received the first Media and Society Award given by the H.H. Herbert School of Journalism and Mass Communications at the University of Oklahoma. for his work to allow cameras and microphones in Oklahoma courtrooms.

Other activities
 As an active member of the First Baptist Church of Durant, Oklahoma, he was Chairman of the Board of Deacons in 1964-1965;
 He was a 33rd Degree Scottish Rite Mason;
 He was a former president of the Durant Kiwanis Club 
 He was a former president of the Durant Junior Chamber of Commerce;
 He was a member of the Putnam City Baptist Church in Oklahoma City.

Death
Justice Hodges died on January 16, 2013, at Bellevue Nursing Center. Family members who preceded him in death were his parents, his wife Janelle and his son Randy.  He was survived by his six children (a son and a daughter he had with Janell and Janelle's four daughters from a previous marriage) and twelve grandchildren. He was interred at Resurrection Memorial Cemetery in Oklahoma City.

Notes

References
 The Supreme Court of the State of Oklahoma

1930 births
2013 deaths
People from Durant, Oklahoma
People from Anadarko, Oklahoma
Politicians from Oklahoma City
Oklahoma Baptist University alumni
University of Oklahoma alumni
Oklahoma lawyers
Oklahoma state court judges
Chief Justices of the Oklahoma Supreme Court
Lawyers from Oklahoma City
20th-century American judges
20th-century American lawyers